Hidden is the fifth studio album by Swedish recording artist Titiyo. It was released on October 29, 2008 on Sheriff Records and Warner Music Sweden.

Track listing

Charts

Weekly charts

References

External links
 Titiyo.com — official site

2008 albums
Titiyo albums